Below are lists of films produced in Hong Kong in the 1970s.

List of Hong Kong films of 1970
List of Hong Kong films of 1971
List of Hong Kong films of 1972
List of Hong Kong films of 1973
List of Hong Kong films of 1974
List of Hong Kong films of 1975
List of Hong Kong films of 1976
List of Hong Kong films of 1977
List of Hong Kong films of 1978
List of Hong Kong films of 1979

See also
List of films set in Hong Kong

External links
 IMDB list of Hong Kong films
 Hong Kong films of the 1970s at HKcinemamagic.com

Films
Hong Kong